The following is a list of films originally produced and/or distributed theatrically by Paramount Pictures and released in the 1920s.

References

External links
 Paramount Pictures Complete Library

 1920-1929
American films by studio
1920s in American cinema
Lists of 1920s films